Audrey Kathleen Kilner Brown MBE (later Court; 24 May 1913 – 11 June 2005) was a British athlete who mainly competed in the 100 metres.

Personal life
She was born in Bankura, India and was the younger sister of Ralph Kilner Brown and older sister of Godfrey Brown. At the age of nine, Brown moved to the United Kingdom. She studied at the University of Birmingham. In 1940, she married William Court.

Career
Whilst at University, Brown competed for the Birchfield Harriers. She competed at the 1933 World Student Games. She competed for Great Britain at the 1936 Summer Olympics held in Berlin, Germany where she won the silver medal in the 4 x 100 metres with her teammates Eileen Hiscock, Violet Olney and Barbara Burke.

After retiring from athletics in 1938, Brown was an employee of Rowntree's Cocoa Works in York.

References

Profile
Track Stats – Audrey Brown

1913 births
2005 deaths
British female sprinters
Olympic athletes of Great Britain
Athletes (track and field) at the 1936 Summer Olympics
Olympic silver medallists for Great Britain
Members of the Order of the British Empire
People from Bankura
Medalists at the 1936 Summer Olympics
Olympic silver medalists in athletics (track and field)
Olympic female sprinters